Below is a list of the deadliest firefighter disasters in the United States, in which more than five firefighters died. "Firefighter" is defined as a professional trained to fight fires. Hence the 1933 Griffith Park fire is excluded, as it killed 29 untrained civilians.

List

Notes

Footnotes

Citations 

Firefighters
Firefighter deaths
Deaths
Firefighter deaths
Firefighter
Firefighter
Firefighter
Disasters